The 2017 Arizona Wildcats football team represented the University of Arizona during the 2017 season. The season was the Wildcats's 118th overall, 40th as a member of the Pac-12 Conference, seventh within the Pac-12 South Division, and the sixth and final year under head coach Rich Rodriguez. The team played their home games at Arizona Stadium in Tucson, Arizona for the 89th straight year.

They finished the regular season with a 7–5, 5–4 in Pac-12 play to finish in third  place in the South Division, making it into a bowl game. They were invited to the Foster Farms Bowl where they faced Purdue, losing 35–38. Rich Rodriguez was fired after 6 seasons with Arizona. After Rich Rodriguez was fired, Kevin Sumlin was named the Wildcats' new full-time head coach on  January 14, 2018.

Previous season

After starting the season 2–1 (the sole victory coming against FCS Grambling State and Hawaii, then lose to BYU).  Under Rodriguez, extending back to the 2012 season, the Wildcats had lost 8 consecutive games to FBS opponents, their last victory coming nearly a year earlier on September 17, 2016, against Hawaii, leading the team to a record of 3–9 (1–8 Pac-12) on the season.

Offseason departures
The Wildcats would lose twenty-nine (twenty seniors due graduation) football players. The Wildcats would lose nine more players from the 2016 team due to various reasons (transfers and withdrawals will be filled out once spring practice occurs). Notable departures from the 2016 squad included.

Preseason

Recruiting Class of 2017

The Wildcats signed 39 players including 10 HS walk-on players, 24 high school recruits, 3 JC transfers from junior colleges and 1 transfers were from NCAA Division I (FBS) programs. Five of the recruits were already enrolled for the spring, 2017 semester while 24 signed letters of intent on National Signing Day is February 3, 2017. Arizona is  combined to be a unanimous top-25 class, ranked as high as (#21 by Scout, #15 by Rivals, #26 by ESPN, and #23 by 247) and finish top-5 in the Pac-12 recruitment class (#4 by 247, #4 by Scout, #4 by ESPN, and #4 by Rivals).

 

 

  
 
 
 
 

 

 

 

Source:

Incoming transfers
In addition to the 2017 recruiting class, Arizona did add four transfers, which includes eligible for the current season, to the 2017 roster:

Position key

Spring practice

Spring game
The 2017 Wildcats had spring practice from February 2017 to March 2, 2017. The 2017 Arizona football spring game will take place in Tucson, AZ at a date and time to be determined.

Fall practice
Fall camp is scheduled for August.

Pac-12 Media Days
Pac-12 media days are set for July 2017 in Hollywood, California.

Returning starters
Arizona returns 30 starters in 2017, including 14 on offense, 9 on defense, and 7 on special teams.

Projecting Returning Starters 2017

Offense (14)

Defense (9)

Special teams (7)

† Indicates player was a starter in 2016 but missed all of 2017 due to injury.

Personnel

Roster

 *2017 Arizona Football Commits (07/28/2017)
Projecting Roster

Coaching staff

Depth chart

Depth Chart Source: 2017 Arizona Wildcats Football Fact Book

True Freshman
Double Position : *

Injury report

Regular season

Schedule
Arizona announced its 2017 football schedule on November 29, 2016. The 2017 Wildcats' schedule consisted of 7 home and 4 away games for the regular season. Arizona hosted nine Pac-12 conference opponents UCLA, Utah, Oregon State and Washington State and traveled to California, Colorado, Oregon, USC and traveled to arch rival  Arizona State for the 91st annual Territorial Cup to close out the regular season. Arizona was not scheduled to play Pac-12 North opponents Stanford and Washington in the 2017 regular season.

Arizona's out of conference opponents represented the American, Big Sky, and C-USA. The Wildcats hosted three non–conference games which were against Northern Arizona from the Big Sky and Houston from the American and traveled to El Paso, TX against Texas–El Paso from the C-USA.

Schedule Source

Game summaries

Northern Arizona

Statistics

To open up the 2017 season, Arizona  will host its in-state rival, the Northern Arizona Lumberjacks for the non conference home opener in Tucson since 2015. Arizona lead the all-time series with 13–1.

Houston

Statistics

After playing Northern Arizona, Arizona will host the Houston Cougars for the second non conference game in Tucson. This will be the first meeting between the schools since 1986. Arizona tied the all-time series with 1–1 apiece.

at UTEP

Statistics

After playing Houston, Arizona will travel to El Paso, TX hosts the UTEP Miners for third and final non conference game of the season. This will be the first meeting between the schools since 2003. Arizona lead the all-time series with 38–11–2.

Utah

Statistics

Following its game against UTEP on the road, Arizona will begin its 2017 Pac-12 conference schedule in Tucson, AZ, Arizona to face the Utah Utes for the first Pac-12 south division game of the season. Arizona lose in the previous meeting to Utah 36–23 in Salt Lake City, UT. Arizona trailed the all-time series by Utah, 19–21–2.

at Colorado 

Statistics

After facing Utah and having a bye week, Arizona visited Colorado. The Wildcats lost their previous meeting to the Buffaloes at home 49–24. Arizona entered the game trailing 14–4 in their all-time series.

The biggest headline from this game was the performance of Khalil Tate, who came off the bench after starting quarterback Brandon Dawkins took a late hit out of bounds on the Wildcats' opening possession. Tate proceeded to run for 327 yards, a single-game FBS record for quarterbacks, breaking the previous record of Northern Illinois' Jordan Lynch set in 2013.

UCLA 

Statistics

After its game against Colorado on the road, Arizona will face UCLA in Arizona's family weekend game in Tucson, AZ. UCLA defeated Arizona in the previous meeting 24–45 in Pasadena, CA. Arizona trailed the all-time series by UCLA 24–15–2.

at California 

Statistics

After its game against UCLA, Arizona will face California in Berkeley, CA for the first non Pac-12 division game of the season. Arizona won the previous meeting at home 49–45 over California in 2014. Arizona has the lead all-time series 16–14–2.

Washington State 

Statistics

After its game against California on the road, Arizona will face Washington State in Arizona's homecoming game at home. Washington State defeated Arizona in the previous meeting 7–69 in Pullman, WA. Arizona has the lead all-time series 26–16.

at USC 

Statistics

After hosting Washington State, Arizona will travel to Los Angeles, CA to face the USC Trojans. Arizona lose in the previous meeting at home to USC 48–14. Arizona trailed the all-time series by USC 32–8.

Oregon State 

Statistics

at Oregon 

Statistics

Following its home game finale against Oregon State, Arizona will play its road game against Oregon. Oregon defeated the Wildcats in a top 10 showdown during the prior meeting at 2014 Pac-12 Championship (rematch from 31–24 at Eugene, OR on October 2, 2014), losing 14–51. Arizona trailed the all-time series by Oregon, 25–16.

at Arizona State (Territorial Cup) 

Statistics

Following its road finale against Oregon, Arizona will close out the 2017 season facing its arch-rivals, the Arizona State Sun Devils, in the 91st meeting of "Territorial Cup" in Tempe, AZ . Arizona won the previous meeting at home over Arizona State 56–35 in last season. Arizona leads the all-time series 49–40–1.

vs. Purdue (Foster Farms Bowl) 

Statistics

Rankings

Statistics

Team
As of 11/25/2017.

Non-conference opponents

Pac-12 opponents

Score total by Quarters

Offense
Rushing

Passing

Receiving

Defense

Special teams

Awards and honors

Preseason award watch lists

Nathan Eldridge
Rimington Trophy

Jacob Alsadek
Wuerffel Trophy

Brandon Dawkins
Johnny Unitas Golden Arm Award

Dane Cruikshank
Senior Bowl

Weekly awards
Khalil Tate (QB) 
Walter Camp Offensive Player of the Week, at Colorado (10/07/17) 
Davey O’Brien Great 8, at Colorado (10/07/17) 
Davey O’Brien Great 8 (2), vs UCLA (10/14/17) 
Davey O’Brien Great 8 (3), vs Washington State (10/28/17)
CFPA National Performer of the Week, at Colorado (10/07/17) 
Rose Bowl: Pac-12 Offensive Player of the Week, at Colorado (10/07/17) 
Rose Bowl: Pac-12 Offensive Player of the Week (2), vs Washington State (10/28/17)
Las Vegas Bowl: Pac-12 Offensive Player of the Week, at Colorado (10/07/17) 
Las Vegas Bowl: Pac-12 Offensive Player of the Week (2), at California (10/21/17)
Las Vegas Bowl: Pac-12 Offensive Player of the Week (3), vs Washington State (10/28/17)
Athlon Sports: Pac-12 Offensive Player of the Week, at Colorado (10/07/17) 
Athlon Sports: Pac-12 Offensive Player of the Week (2), at California (10/21/17)
Athlon Sports: Pac-12 Offensive Player of the Week (3), vs Washington (10/28/17)
Pac-12 Offensive Player of the Week, at Colorado (10/07/17)
Pac-12 Offensive Player of the Week (2), vs UCLA (10/14/17)
Pac-12 Offensive Player of the Week (3), at California (10/21/17)
Pac-12 Offensive Player of the Week (4), vs Washington State (10/28/17)
Helmet Award Player of the Week, at Colorado (10/07/17)
Helmet Award Player of the Week (2), vs UCLA (10/14/17)
Helmet Award Player of the Week (3), at California (10/21/17)
Helmet Award Player of the Week (4), vs Oregon State (11/11/17)
Brandon Dawkins (QB)
Helmet Award Player of the Week, vs. NAU (09/02/17)
Helmet Award Player of the Week (2), at UTEP (09/15/17)
Nick Wilson (RB)
Helmet Award Player of the Week, vs. NAU (09/02/17)
Helmet Award Player of the Week (2), vs UCLA (10/14/17)
J. J. Taylor (RB)
Helmet Award Player of the Week, vs. NAU (09/02/17)
Helmet Award Player of the Week (2), vs. Houston (09/09/17)
Helmet Award Player of the Week (3), vs. Oregon State (11/11/17)
Zach Green (RB)
Helmet Award Player of the Week, at California (10/21/17)
TJ Johnson (WR)
Helmet Award Player of the Week, vs. NAU (09/02/17)
Shawn Poindexter (WR)
Helmet Award Player of the Week, at Colorado (10/07/17)
Shun Brown (WR)
Helmet Award Player of the Week, vs. NAU (09/02/17)
Helmet Award Player of the Week (2), at UTEP (09/15/17)
Nathan Eldridge (OL)
Helmet Award Player of the Week, at Colorado (10/07/17)
Helmet Award Player of the Week (2), vs UCLA (10/14/17)
Christian Boettcher (OL)
Helmet Award Player of the Week, at California (10/21/17)
Gerhard de Beer (OL)
Student Player of the Week, vs Utah (09/22/17)
Jacob Alsadek (OL)
Student Player of the Week, at UTEP (09/15/17)
Bryce Wolma (TE) 
Helmet Award Player of the Week, at UTEP (09/15/17)
Student Player of the Week, vs Washington (10/28/17)
Kwesi Mashack (CB)
Helmet Award Player of the Week, vs. Houston (09/09/17) 
Jace Whittaker (CB)
Student Player of the Week, at Colorado (10/07/17)
Helmet Award Player of the Week, vs UCLA (10/14/17)
Antonio Parks (CB)
Student Player of the Week, vs NAU (09/02/17)
Finton Connolly (DL)
Student Player of the Week, at California (10/07/17)
Dereck Boles (DL)
Helmet Award Player of the Week, vs. Oregon State (11/11/17)
Luca Bruno (DL)
Helmet Award Player of the Week, vs. Oregon State (11/11/17)
Tony Fields II (LB)
Helmet Award Player of the Week, vs. Houston (09/09/17)
Colin Schooler (LB)
Helmet Award Player of the Week, vs. Houston (09/09/17)
Helmet Award Player of the Week (2), at UTEP (09/15/17)
Helmet Award Player of the Week (3), at California (10/21/17)
Helmet Award Player of the Week (4), vs. Oregon State (11/11/17)
Athlon Sports: Pac-12 Defensive Freshman Player of the Week, at California (10/21/17)  
Pac-12 Defensive Player of the Week, at California (10/21/17)
Kylan Wilborn (LB)
Helmet Award Player of the Week, at UTEP (09/15/17)
Helmet Award Player of the Week (2), vs UCLA (10/14/17)
Chacho Ulloa (S)
Student Player of the Week, vs UCLA (10/14/17)
Jarrius Wallace (S)
Helmet Award Player of the Week, at California (10/21/17)
Lucas Havarisik (PK)
Helmet Award Player of the Week, vs. NAU (09/02/17)
Pac-12 Special Teams Player of the Week, vs Washington State (10/28/17)
Josh Pollack (PK)
Helmet Award Player of the Week, vs. Houston (09/09/17)
Jake Glatting (P)
Student Player of the Week, vs Houston (09/09/17)

Yearly awards
 Khalil Tate
 *Maxwell Award semifinalist 
 *Davey O’Brien Award semifinalist 
 *Walter Camp Player of the Year Award semifinalist 
 *Manning Award finalist
 *AP Pac-12 Newcomer Player of the Year (2017)

 J. J. Taylor
 Pac-12 Offensive Freshman Player of the Year

 Colin Schooler
 Pac-12 Defensive Freshman Player of the Year

All-Americans
Each year several publications release lists of their ideal "team". The athletes on these lists are referred to as All-Americans. The NCAA recognizes five All-American lists. They are the Associated Press (AP), American Football Coaches Association (AFCA), Football Writers Association of America (FWAA), Sporting News (SN), and the Walter Camp Football Foundation (WCFF). If a player is selected to the first team of three publications he is considered a consensus All-American, if a player is selected to the first team of all five publications he is considered a unanimous All-American.

Khalil Tate
College Football News Pac-12 Top 30 (2017)

Nathan Eldridge
 All-Pac-12 AP 2nd team (2017)

Kylan Wilborn
 All-Pac-12 AP 2nd team (2017)
USA Today Freshman All American (2017)

Colin Schooler 
USA Today Freshman All American (2017)
ESPN Freshman All American (2017)
247sports Freshman All American (2017)

Jace Whittaker
 All-Pac-12 AP 2nd team (2017)

Tony Fields II 
ESPN Freshman All American (2017)
247sports Freshman All American (2017)

Lorenzo Burns
College Football News All-Pac-12 (2017)
College Football News Pac-12 Top 30 (2017)

Key:
First team
Consensus All-American
Unanimous All-American

All-Pac-12 teams
Jacob Alsadek
 All-Pac-12 honorable mention (2017)

Shun Brown
 All-Pac-12 honorable mention (2017)

Nate Eldridge
 All-Pac-12 honorable mention (2017)

Colin Schooler
 All-Pac-12 honorable mention (2017)

Khalil Tate
 All-Pac-12 honorable mention (2017)

Nick Wilson
 All-Pac-12 honorable mention (2017)

All-Academic Teams

NCAA Academic All-Americans

All-Pac-12 Academic
Khalil Tate (QB) 
All-Pac-12 Academic Honorable Mention (2017)
Branden Leon (RB) 
All-Pac-12 Academic Honorable Mention (2017)
Jamie Nunley (TE) 
All-Pac-12 Academic Honorable Mention (2017)
Christian Boettcher (OL) 
All-Pac-12 Academic First Team (2017) 
Malcolm Holland (CB) 
All-Pac-12 Academic First Team (2017) 
Jake Glatting (P) 
All-Pac-12 Academic Second Team (2017) 
Josh Pollack (PK) 
All-Pac-12 Academic Honorable Mention (2017)

National winners

Record broken

Honors and Awards Source: 2017 Arizona Media Notes (unless otherwise noted)

Players in the 2018 NFL draft

Media affiliates

Radio

ESPN Radio – (ESPN Tucson 1490 AM & 104.09 FM) – Nationwide (Dish Network, Sirius XM, TuneIn radio and iHeartRadio)
KCUB 1290 AM – Football Radio Show – (Tucson, AZ)
KHYT – 107.5 FM (Tucson, AZ)
KTKT 990 AM – La Hora de Los Gatos (Spanish) – (Tucson, AZ)
KGME 910 AM – (IMG Sports Network) – (Phoenix, AZ)
KTAN 1420 AM – (Sierra Vista, AZ)
KDAP 96.5 FM (Douglas, Arizona)
KWRQ 102.3 FM – (Safford, AZ/Thatcher, AZ)
KIKO 1340 AM – (Globe, AZ)
KVWM 970 AM – (Show Low, AZ/Pinetop-Lakeside, AZ)
XENY 760 – (Nogales, Sonora) (Spanish)

TV
KOLD (CBS)
KGUN (ESPN College Football on ABC/ABC)
FOX/FS1 (Fox Sports Media Group)
ESPN/ESPN2/ESPNU (ESPN Family)
CBS Sports Network
Pac-12 Network (Pac-12 Arizona)

References

Arizona
Arizona Wildcats football seasons
Arizona Wildcats football